Violet may refer to:

Common meanings
 Violet (color), a spectral color with wavelengths shorter than blue
 One of a list of plants known as violet, particularly:
 Viola (plant), a genus of flowering plants

Places

United States
 Violet, Louisiana
 Violet, Missouri
 Violet, Texas
 Violet, West Virginia

Elsewhere
 Violet, Ontario, Canada

Media and entertainment

Film
 Violet (1921 film), a German silent film
 Violet (1978 film), a Croatian feature film
 Violet (1981 film), a short film
 Violet (2021 film), an American drama film

Music

Albums
 Violet (The Birthday Massacre album), 2004
 Violet (Closterkeller album), 1993
 Violet, a 2018 EP by Pentagon

Songs
 "Violet" (Daniel Caesar song), 2015
 "Violet" (Hole song), 1995
 "Violet" (Seal song), 1992
 "Violet", a 2017 song by Pentagon from Demo_02

Other uses
 Violet (opera), a 2005 opera by Roger Scruton
 Violet (musical), by Jeanine Tesori
 Violet (computer game), a 2008 interactive fiction game
 Pokémon Violet, one of the two paired Pokémon Scarlet and Violet games for the Nintendo Switch

People
 Violet (given name), a female given name
 Arlene Violet, American nun and Attorney General
 Pierre-Noël Violet, Flemish-French miniature-painter
 Tessa Violet, American singer-songwriter

Other uses
 NYU Violets, the teams of New York University
 Sea violet, Microcosmus sabatieri, a species of edible Mediterranean tunicate

See also
 Violeta (disambiguation)
 Violetta (disambiguation)
 Violette (disambiguation)
 Viola (disambiguation)